Forced disappearance in Pakistan originated during the military dictator General Pervez Musharraf (1999 to 2008). The practice continued during subsequent governments. The term missing persons is sometimes used as a euphemism. According to Amina Masood Janjua, a human rights activist and chairperson of Defence of Human Rights Pakistan, there are more than 5,000 reported cases of forced disappearance in Pakistan. Human rights activists allege that the law enforcement agencies in Pakistan are responsible for the cases of forced disappearance in Pakistan. However, the law enforcement agencies in Pakistan deny this and insist that many of the missing persons have either joined militant organisations such as the TTP in Afghanistan and other conflict zones or they have fled to be an illegal immigrant in Europe and died en route.

Since 2011, the government of Pakistan established a Commission to investigate cases of enforced disappearance in Pakistan. The Commission reports that it has received 7,000 cases of enforced disappearance since its inception and it has resolved around 5,000 of those cases.

Background 
The practice of enforced disappearance is a global problem that afflicts people in various countries and with different ethnicity, religions and political backgrounds. Although the enforced disappearance is a crime under international law, the U.N. has recorded thousands of disappearances in over 100 countries in recent decade. Some of the countries which are crucially charged with the allegations of enforced disappearances include Iraq, Iran, Sri Lanka, Chile, Ethiopia, Syria, African countries, Bangladesh, India, China, Russia, US and Pakistan.

From 1999 to 2008
After the US invasion of Afghanistan in 2001, forced disappearance in Pakistan allegedly began during the rule of military dictator General Pervez Musharraf (1999 to 2008). Pakistan went under immense terrorist activities. A large number of people became the victim of suicidal attacks. During 'War on Terror', many people were suspected as terrorists and then taken away by Govt agencies. Many of them were then handed over to the United States authorities to be imprisoned in the Guantanamo Bay's Camp X-Ray. After Musharaf resigned in August 2008, he was charged with various human rights violations.

From 2009 to present 
According to Amina Masood Janjua, a human rights activist and chairperson of Defence of Human Rights Pakistan, there are more than 5,000 reported cases of forced disappearance in Pakistan.Defence of Human Rights Pakistan is a not for profit organization working against forced disappearance in Pakistan. The families of missing persons have also staged protest across Pakistan demanding to know the whereabouts their missing family members.

Balochistan

Most of the cases of forced disappearances in recent year were reported in Pakistan's Balochistan province which has been witnessing a low-level insurgency for more than a decade and a half. According to Voice for Baloch Missing Persons (VBMP) around 528 Baloch people have gone missing from 2001 to 2017.

A senior Pakistani provincial security official says that missing person figures are 'exaggerated', that 'in Balochistan, insurgents, immigrants who fled to Europe and even those who have been killed in military operations are declared as missing persons'. Reports have shown that many people have fled the province to seek asylum in other countries because of the unrest caused by separatist militants.

Similarly separatist militants have also been found responsible for forced disappearances cases. Separatist militants usually wear military uniform while carrying out their militant activities. Hence they often get mistaken as security officials.

People who have at any point gone missing
Masood Ahmed Janjua (Husband of Amina Masood Janjua)
 Safdar Sarki
 Saud Memon
 Aafia Siddiqui and her three children
 Hafiz Abdul Basit
 Muzafar Bhutto
 Zeenat Shahzadi, a 24-year-old female journalist who was investigating a disappearance case, was allegedly abducted by some armed personnel on 19 August 2015 and went missing. Her disappearance caused her younger brother to commit suicide. She was later recovered from near the Pakistan-Afghanistan border in October 2017.
 In early January 2017, five social media activists – Salman Haider, Ahmad Waqass Goraya, Aasim Saeed, and Ahmad Raza Naseer – went missing from different parts of Pakistan. Salman Haider was also a poet and academic. However, after few days, all of the bloggers returned to their homes. Their families confirmed their return and reported that all of the bloggers were unharmed.

Some have reported to have been handed over to the CIA and/or flown to Bagram, Afghanistan and later shipped off to Guantanamo Bay. Reports of forced abductions by the Pakistani state first began arising in 2001, in the aftermath of the United States invasion of Afghanistan and the commencement of the US-led War on Terror. Many of the missing persons are activists associated with the Baloch nationalist and Sindhi nationalist movements.

Criticism
The cases of forced disappearances were criticized by human rights organizations and the media. They have urged the government of Pakistan to probe these incidents. In 2011, a Commission of Inquiry on Enforced Disappearances was formed, but there was little progress in the investigation.

In January 2021, the Islamabad High Court, after hearing a petition on a disappearance case from 2015, ruled that the prime minister of Pakistan and his cabinet were responsible for the state’s failure to protect its citizens “because the buck stops at the top.” The court also termed enforced disappearances as “the most heinous crime and intolerable.”

Government response
In 2011, a Commission of Inquiry on Enforced Disappearances was formed by the government of Pakistan to investigate the cases of forced disappearances in the country. According to Amnesty International, the commission has so far received 3,000 cases of such disappearances. By 2021, the Commission reports that it has received 7,000 cases of forced disappearance since its inception and it has resolved around 5,000 of those cases.

In June 2021, the Pakistan's interior minister introduced a bill in National Assembly of Pakistan which criminalized enforced disappearance in the country with 10-year imprisonment for anyone found guilty of it. The bill was later passed by National Assembly of Pakistan in November 2021.

See also
 Forced disappearance
 Enforced disappearance of Mushtaq Mahar
 Gun politics in Pakistan
 Human rights in Pakistan
 Target killings in Pakistan

References

Further reading
 
 
 
 
 
 
 
 
 
 
 
 
 

Enforced disappearances in Pakistan
Extrajudicial killings
Human rights abuses in Pakistan
Targeted killings in Pakistan
Torture in Pakistan